Kevin Hernández may refer to:

Kevin Hernández (footballer, born 1985), Honduran footballer
Kevin Hernández (footballer, born 1999), Puerto Rican footballer
, Argentine basketball player